Black Rock is a low rock  southeast of Shag Rocks and some  west-northwest of South Georgia. Black Rock may have been considered as part of the "Aurora Islands" reported in this vicinity by the ship Aurora in 1762. It was charted in 1927 by Discovery Investigations personnel on the William Scoresby.

Argentina lays claim to many islands of the area, including Black Rock and Shag Rocks. The Falklands War of 1982 was fought by Britain and Argentina not only over the territories of the Falkland Islands, but also over South Georgia and the South Sandwich Islands. Black Rock and Shag Rocks are on the route from the Falkland Islands to South Georgia Island, on the seamount of Scotia Ridge.

See also 
 List of Antarctic islands north of 60° S

References

 

Islands of South Georgia
Uninhabited islands of South Georgia and the South Sandwich Islands